The Wyoming State Bar is the integrated (mandatory) bar association of the U.S. state of Wyoming.

History 
The Wyoming State Bar was organized in 1915 as a voluntary association, and integrated by the state legislature in 1939.

Structure
The Bar is managed by a 12-member Board of Officers and Commissioners.  Supporting the Board are more than twenty Boards and Committees.
 
The Bar enforces the rule that Wyoming lawyers must complete 15 credits of Continuing Legal Education each year. 

The Wyoming State Bar publishes the monthly Wyoming Bar Journal
and the biannual Wyoming Law Review which includes scholarly articles by national legal authorities, and case notes and comments written by students at the University of Wyoming College of Law.

References

American state bar associations
Government of Wyoming
1915 establishments in Wyoming
Organizations established in 1915